Tik Dar (also Romanized as Tīk Dar; also known as Takdar) is a village in Ravar Rural District, in the Central District of Ravar County, Kerman Province, Iran. At the 2006 census, its population was 18, in 5 families.

References 

Populated places in Ravar County